Kaddam is a village in Nirmal district in the state of Telangana in south India.

Geography
It has an average elevation of 293 meters (964 feet).

Demographics

According to Indian census, 2001, the demographic details of Kaddam mandal is as follows
Villages:              76
Panchayats:            25
Total Population: 	48,632	in 11,093  Households.
Male Population: 	24,592	and Female Population: 	24,040

Villages
The villages in Kaddam mandal includes: Peddur, Chinna Camp, Khannapur or Kannapur, Kondukur, Patha Kondukur or Old Kondukur, Pedda Bellal, Uppari, Gudam, HariZana Wada, MorriGudam, Chinna Bellal, Peraka Palli, Chityal, Ella Gadapa or Yella Gadapa, Sarangapur or SarangaPoor, LingaPoor or Lingapur, Muthyampet, Peddur Tanda, Dharmaji pet, Pandvapur, Ambaripet, Godisiryala, Boothkur, Laxmipur, Navabpet, Kalleda, Gangapur, Dosthnagar, Allampalli, Munyal, Maddipadaga, Dasturabad, Bhuthkur, Singapur, Rajura, Devuniguddam, Rampoor, Perkapella, Godiseral, Revojipet, Buttapour, Mallapour, Islampour, Meddachintha, Gandigopalpour, Misampet.

References 

Mandals in Adilabad district